Lani Rose Cabrera (born 22 April 1993) is a Barbadian swimmer. She competed in the women's 400 metre freestyle event at the 2016 Summer Olympics where she ranked 30th with a time of 4:28.95. She did not advance to the semifinals.

References

External links
 

1993 births
Living people
Barbadian female swimmers
Olympic swimmers of Barbados
Swimmers at the 2016 Summer Olympics
Place of birth missing (living people)
Pan American Games competitors for Barbados
Swimmers at the 2011 Pan American Games
Swimmers at the 2015 Pan American Games
Commonwealth Games competitors for Barbados
Swimmers at the 2014 Commonwealth Games
Barbadian female freestyle swimmers
Florida Gulf Coast Eagles women's swimmers